Buechele is a surname. Notable people with the surname include:

Shane Buechele (born 1998), American football player
Steve Buechele (born 1961), American baseball player

See also
Büchel (disambiguation)

References

German-language surnames